Linda Antić-Mrdalj (born 14 January 1969) is a former Yugoslavian and Croatian basketball player and Croatian basketball coach.

External links
Profile at fiba.com

1969 births
Living people
Basketball players from Šibenik
Croatian women's basketball players
Yugoslav women's basketball players
Croatian women's basketball coaches